Lasalle (also known as Lasalle—Émard—Côte Saint-Paul) was a federal electoral district in Quebec, Canada, that was represented in the House of Commons of Canada from 1968 to 1988.

This riding was created in 1966 from parts of Jacques-Cartier—Lasalle and Saint-Henri ridings.

It consisted of the City of LaSalle and a part of the City of Montreal bordering on that city.

The name of the electoral district was changed in 1973 to "Lasalle—Émard—Côte Saint-Paul".

The electoral district was abolished in 1976 when it was redistributed into a new Lasalle riding, and Verdun and Westmount ridings.

The electoral district was abolished in 1987 when it was merged into LaSalle—Émard riding.

Members of Parliament

This riding elected the following Members of Parliament:

Election results

Lasalle, 1968–1974

Lasalle—Émard—Côte Saint-Paul, 1974–1979

Lasalle, 1979–1988

See also 
 List of Canadian federal electoral districts
 Past Canadian electoral districts

External links
Riding history from the Library of Parliament
Lasalle 1966-1973
Lasalle—Émard—Côte Saint-Paul 1973-1976
Lasalle 1976-1987

Former federal electoral districts of Quebec